AEON-Amity, more commonly known as Amity is a chain of private English schools (eikaiwa) in Japan, owned by, but operated independently (since 1994) of the larger AEON corporation. While AEON schools proper teach mostly adult students, Amity schools service almost exclusively children, from babies to teenagers.

The company is headquartered in Okayama and has over 70 schools in Japan.

Curriculum and Teaching Methodology

Aeon-Amity bases its curriculum off of the English as a foreign language (EFL) learning principles of speaking, listening comprehension, reading, and writing. The teaching methodology employed at Amity is designed to draw on visual, audio, and kinesthetic learning styles. Teachers also create props to provide context and meaning for the lessons, and they utilize repetition for pointing out incorrect usages of language. Teachers also commonly use teaching materials such as songs, books, and other print-based and non-print-based materials.

Lesson Types

Amity offers group lessons, semi-private lessons, private lessons, and interactive lessons. Depending on the type of lesson, instruction time will range from 40 to 50 minutes.

Teachers

Amity hires teachers from both Japan and abroad. Teachers from abroad are given the title of Native English Teacher (NET), and they must have native-level English proficiency.

In order to teach at Amity, prospective teachers must possess a bachelor's degree.

The salary for beginning teachers is 275,000 yen before deductions and taxes. The typical work week runs from Tuesday to Saturday.

Scandals

On June 4, 2011, a 22-year-old woman who worked for the Kanazawa branch of Amity committed suicide. The Kanazawa Labor Inspections Office determined she had died from karoushi, or death from overwork. Officials estimated that the woman had worked roughly 111 hours of overtime each month, with 82 of those hours of that time being spent working at home.

References

External links
 Amity Homepage

Okayama
Schools in Japan